Colonel Ruth Alice Lucas (November 28, 1920 – March 23, 2013), the first African American woman in the Air Force to be promoted to the rank of colonel and who at the time of her retirement was the highest-ranking African American woman in the Air Force.

Biography

Early life and entrance into the military 

Ruth Alice Lucas was born in Stamford, Connecticut, on November 28, 1920. Shortly after graduation, Col. Lucas enlisted in the Women's Army Auxiliary Corps (WAAC) in 1942 and was one of the first black women to attend what is now the Joint Forces Staff College in Norfolk, VA. She transferred from the Army to the newly created Air Force in 1947.

Education, Career 

She was a 1942 education graduate of what is now Tuskegee University in Alabama.

In the early 1950s, while stationed at an Air Force base in Tokyo, Col. Lucas taught English to Japanese schoolchildren and college students in her spare time.

She received a master's degree in educational psychology from Columbia University in 1957 and moved to the Washington, D.C. area in the early 1960s.

Col. Lucas held a variety of positions, mainly in research and education, before being named a colonel in 1968.
At the time of her promotion, Col. Lucas was a general education and counseling services assistant in the office of the deputy assistant secretary of defense for education at the Pentagon. She created, organized and implemented special literacy programs aimed to increase the education levels of service personnel.

“Most people don’t realize that among all the servicemen who enter the military annually, about 45,000 of them read below the fifth-grade level, and more than 30 percent of these men are black,” she said in a 1969 interview with Ebony Magazine. “Right now if I have any aim, it’s just to reach these men, to interest them in education and to motivate them to continue on.”

Many men saw results from her programs and management, including retired Master Sgt. Alfonzo Hall, who served in the same division as Col. Lucas in the 1950s.

“She saw the big picture,” Hall said in an interview. “Every day, every month and every quarter, we men saw results. She ate, slept and breathed training. She believed it was critical for military and civilian life.”

“She looked at all people as people and tried to help them all,” Hall said.

“There were times when I thought about getting out, but I decided that I could best utilize my training right here in the service,” Col. Lucas recalled to Ebony Magazine. “One year slipped into another, and, well, when my promotion came last year, it just seemed to cap all my previous experiences.”

Retirement 

Col. Lucas retired from the Air Force in 1970. Her military decorations included the Defense Meritorious Service Medal.

Post Retirement 

After her military retirement, Col. Lucas became the director of urban services at the old Washington Technical Institute, one of three schools that merged in 1977 to form the University of the District of Columbia. She designed outreach programs to encourage high school students to pursue higher education. In 1994, she retired as the assistant to the dean of UDC’s College of Physical Science, Engineering and Technology.

Col. Lucas was a past member of a Washington Urban League advisory panel on education and worked with the U.S. Equal Employment Opportunity Commission to improve testing techniques.

Death 

Col. Lucas died March 23, 2013, at her home in Washington, D.C. She was 92. She had inanition and cardiac arrest.

Survivors include two great-nieces whom she helped raise as children, Laurie Ward and Elaine Ward, both of Washington, D.C.

Col. Lucas is buried at Arlington National Cemetery.

References

External links 
 Ebony Article: Nov 1969
 First African American Female Air Force Colonel Buried At Arlington Cemetery

1920 births
2013 deaths
United States Air Force officers
African-American female military personnel
Women in the United States Air Force
Burials at Arlington National Cemetery
20th-century African-American people
21st-century African-American people
20th-century African-American women
21st-century African-American women
African-American United States Air Force personnel